Li Yong-nam (born 4 June 1956) is a North Korean wrestler. He competed in the men's freestyle 48 kg at the 1976 Summer Olympics.

References

1956 births
Living people
North Korean male sport wrestlers
Olympic wrestlers of North Korea
Wrestlers at the 1976 Summer Olympics
Place of birth missing (living people)
20th-century North Korean people